Shemiranat may refer to:
 Shemiran, a neighbourhood of Tehran, Iran
Shemiranat County, an administrative division of Tehran Province, Iran